Alireza Soleimani Karbalaei (2 February 1956 – 21 May 2014) was an Iranian heavyweight freestyle wrestler. He was the first, and to date the only, Iranian to win the world superheavyweight title, which he achieved in 1989. He served as the flag bearer for Iran at the 1992 Summer Olympics, where he placed sixth.

Besides freestyle wrestling, Soleimani was a champion in varzesh-e bastani and won the Pahlevan of Iran title and armband in Pahlevani traditional wrestling six times.

References

1956 births
2014 deaths
Wrestlers at the 1976 Summer Olympics
Wrestlers at the 1992 Summer Olympics
Iranian male sport wrestlers
Olympic wrestlers of Iran
Asian Games gold medalists for Iran
Asian Games medalists in wrestling
Pahlevans of Iran
Wrestlers at the 1986 Asian Games
World Wrestling Champions
Medalists at the 1986 Asian Games
Asian Wrestling Championships medalists
20th-century Iranian people
21st-century Iranian people